The 2014–15 Brownsville Barracudas season was the inaugural season for the Brownsville Barracudas professional indoor soccer club. (The team was also known as Barracudas FC.) The Barracudas, a Southern Division team in the Major Arena Soccer League, played their home games at the Barracudas Sports Complex in Brownsville, Texas.

The team was led by owner Oscar Ruvalcaba, general manager Ricardo Rodriguez, and head coach Raul Salazar. The Barracudas finished the 2014–15 season with a 4–16 record, good enough for 4th place in the Southern Division but not enough to qualify for the playoffs.

Season summary
Brownsville began the season with a road defeat by the Monterrey Flash before a home opening win against Saltillo Rancho Seco. The team then lost 8 consecutive games before an overtime win at home against Saltillo. Another 6 losses (3 each to the Dallas Sidekicks and Oxford City FC of Texas) preceded a win in Brownsville's final home game against Saltillo. Splitting a road series in Saltillo to end the season, Brownsville ended with a 4–16 record and 4th place in the Southern Division. All 4 of Brownsville's wins came at the expense of Saltillo.

History

Team owner Oscar Ruvalcaba started laying the groundwork for this team in 2001 when he began developing the Barracudas Sports Complex to add more soccer fields in his community. The complex opened in 2004 and began hosting several games each week. Barracudas FC organized as an amateur club that same year and, a decade later, the complex hosts almost 200 teams playing 7-on-7 soccer each week. In May 2014, Ruvalcaba secured an expansion franchise in the new Major Arena Soccer League and began construction of a 2,000-seat open-air soccer arena.

Off-field moves
In May 2014, the Professional Arena Soccer League added six refugee teams from the failed third incarnation of the Major Indoor Soccer League and reorganized as the Major Arena Soccer League. The 2014–15 MASL season will be 20 games long, 4 more than the 16 regular season games of recent PASL seasons. Brownsville joins the league in the new Southern division. The other Southern teams for 2014–15 are the Dallas Sidekicks, Hidalgo La Fiera, Monterrey Flash, Saltillo Rancho Seco, and Beaumont-based Oxford City FC of Texas.

The Barracudas publicly displayed their new MASL uniforms for the first time on October 18 in the food court at Sunrise Mall in Brownsville. The new uniforms, manufactured by Pirma, use the same colors as the team has worn since its founding as an amateur club in 2004. Brownsville's home uniforms are light blue with white sides and the away uniforms are white with a blue collar.

Schedule

Pre-season

Regular season

 Originally scheduled for January 31 but rescheduled after Hidalgo La Fiera left the league mid-season.
 Originally scheduled for November 7 but postponed due to weather.
 Rescheduled due to mid-season withdrawal of Hidalgo, maintaining 20-game schedule.
 Postponed due to travel issues caused by "recent acts of violence" in northern Mexico

Awards and honors
The Brownsville Herald declared the debut of the Barracudas franchise as one of the Brownsville metro area's best sports stories of 2014.

Brownsville's Moises Gonzalez earned honorable mention for the league's all-rookie team for 2014-15.

References

External links
Brownsville Barracudas official website
Brownsville Barracudas at The Brownsville Herald
Brownsville Barracudas at El Nuevo Heraldo

Brownsville Barracudas
Brownsville Barracudas
Brownsville Barracudas 2014
Brownsville Barracudas 2014
Brownsville Barracudas 2014